"Money" is a song written and recorded by American country music artist K. T. Oslin.  It was released in July 1988 as the first single from the album This Woman.  The song reached #13 on the Billboard Hot Country Singles & Tracks chart.

It was after listening to this song and its message that Charles Van Doren decided to not participate in the 1994 Robert Redford film Quiz Show as a consultant.

Chart performance

References

1988 singles
K. T. Oslin songs
Song recordings produced by Harold Shedd
Songs written by K. T. Oslin
RCA Records Nashville singles
1988 songs